Burak Can Kalender (born 24 June 1995) is a Turkish footballer who plays as a midfielder for Gönen Belediyespor. He made his Süper Lig debut on 17 May 2013.

References

External links
 
 
 

1995 births
Living people
People from Seyhan
Turkish footballers
Mersin İdman Yurdu footballers
Süper Lig players
Association football midfielders